is a Japanese manga artist. He is known for writing and illustrating Teasing Master Takagi-san, In the Heart of Kunoichi Tsubaki, and When Will Ayumu Make His Move?.

Personal life
Yamamoto was born and raised in the town of Tonoshō in Shōdoshima, an island part of Kagawa Prefecture. His hometown would later serve as the setting for Teasing Master Takagi-san.

He is a graduate of Kyoto Seika University Faculty of Art.

Works

Manga
 Teasing Master Takagi-san (2013–ongoing, currently serialized in Monthly Shōnen Sunday)
 Fudatsuki no Kyoko-chan (2013–2016, serialized in Monthly Shōnen Sunday)
 Ashita wa Doyōbi (2014–2015, serialized in Yomiuri Chūkōsei Shimbun)
 In the Heart of Kunoichi Tsubaki (2018–ongoing, currently serialized in Monthly Shonen Sunday)
 When Will Ayumu Make His Move? (2019–ongoing, currently serialized in Weekly Shōnen Magazine)
 Kaijū no Tokage (2019–2020, serialized in Bessatsu Shōnen Champion)

References

External links
 
 

1986 births
Manga artists from Kagawa Prefecture
Living people